Eugen Mihăescu (born 24 August 1937 in Bucharest) is a Romanian painter and politician. He is a member of the Greater Romania Party and was a Member of the European Parliament from 1 January 2007, date of the accession of Romania to the European Union, until 20 May 2007. While in the European Parliament, he was the vice-chair of the far-right Identity, Tradition and Sovereignty group.

External links
European Parliament profile
European Parliament official photo

1937 births
Living people
Artists from Bucharest
Greater Romania Party politicians
Members of the Senate of Romania
Greater Romania Party MEPs
MEPs for Romania 2007
Romanian painters
Honorary members of the Romanian Academy
Politicians from Bucharest